Jimmy Arias was the defending champion, but did not participate this year.

Eliot Teltscher won the title, defeating Andrés Gómez in the final, 7–5, 3–6, 6–1.

Seeds

Draw

Finals

Top half

Section 1

Section 2

Section 3

Section 4

References

 Main Draw

1983 Japan Open Tennis Championships